Hubbelrath is an urban quarter (Stadtteil) of Düsseldorf, part of Borough 7. It borders to Gerresheim, Mettmann, Erkrath and Ratingen.

The name comes from the old estate Hupoldesroth, which was written mentioned first time in 950 A.D.
Hubbelrath was a farming settlement with an old romanic church.
After Hubbelrath became a part of Düsseldorf in 1975 Hubbelrath got three new settlements: Knittkuhl - its nucleus was the estate Knittkuhl, but it hasn't been a settlement before it became a part of Düsseldorf, the Stratenhof-settlement and the settlement Rotthäuser Weg. Knittkuhl was split from Hubbelrath to form a separate Stadtteil in 2014.
In Hubbelrath there are a green fee and a barracks of the Bundeswehr.

References

Urban districts and boroughs of Düsseldorf